Holy Trinity College may refer to:

Holy Trinity College, Hong Kong
Holy Trinity College, Cookstown in County Tyrone, Northern Ireland
Holy Trinity College Bromley, a former school in London
Holy Trinity College of General Santos City in General Santos, Philippines
Holy Trinity College, Catholic University of Zimbabwe in Harare, Zimbabwe
 Holy Trinity College, former name of Holy Trinity University, in Puerto Princesa City
Theological College of the Holy Trinity, in Addis Ababa, Ethiopia
Holy Trinity College, precursor to the University of Dallas

See also
 Holy Trinity (disambiguation)
 Holy Trinity Academy (disambiguation)
 Holy Trinity School (disambiguation)